Misao Seki was a film actor and comedian who worked in Japan and Hollywood from the 1910s through the 1940s. He appeared in more than 100 films over the course of his career.

Biography 
Seki was reportedly born in Yokohama, Japan, into a well-known family of actors; he began acting around the age of 5. He attained a level of fame as an actor and comedian in his native country before moving briefly to the U.S. as a young man. After appearing in vaudeville shows in Seattle and San Francisco, he took on roles in a string of English-language films in Hollywood. Later in his career, he appeared mostly in Japanese films.

Selected filmography 

 Kaigun (1943)
 Flowers of Patriotism (1942)
 Capricious Young Man (1936)
 Mumyodô (1930)
 Nâniwa kâgamî (1930)
 Crossroads (1928)
 A Page of Madness (1926)
 Zoku Amateur Club (1923)
 The Vermilion Pencil (1922)
 Five Days to Live (1922)
 Where Lights Are Low (1921)
 The Outside Woman (1921)
 The Breath of the Gods (1920)
 Mystic Faces (1918)
 Her American Husband (1918)

References 

Japanese film actors
Male actors from Yokohama
1884 births
Year of death missing